St. Anne High School was a coeducational Catholic high school in Warren, Michigan.

The school opened in 1965 and was operated by the Sisters, Servants of the Immaculate Heart of Mary.  It closed in 1987.

References

1965 establishments in Michigan
High schools in Michigan
Defunct Catholic secondary schools in Michigan
Warren, Michigan
Educational institutions established in 1965